The 2013 Copa Libertadores Femenina was the fifth edition of the Copa Libertadores Femenina, CONMEBOL's premier annual international women's football club tournament. It was held in Foz do Iguaçu in Brazil. The competition was supposed to start on 12 October, just one week prior to that however, the whole competition was rescheduled from 27 October to 7 November due to logistical problems stated by the Local Organizing Committee. Clubs were given the possibility to change up to five players in their previous submitted squads.

Colo Colo were the defending champions. The title was won by São José, their second title after 2011.

Maitté Zamorano won the top-scorer award playing for Mundo Futuro by scoring seven goals.

Qualification
The competition was contested by twelve teams, the champion club from each of the ten nations plus the title holders, Colo Colo, and one additional team from Brazil, the hosts. As Colo Colo had also won the Chilean championship, Everton de Viña del Mar participated additionally as runners-up.

First stage
The group winner and the best runners-up advanced to the semifinals. The draw was held on 26 September 2013.

All times are Brasília time, UTC-03.

Group A
Mundo Futuro moved on to the semi-finals as best second placed team.

Group B

Group C

Knockout stage
Per draw Group A and B winners met with the best second-place finisher meeting Group C winner in the semi-finals.

Semifinals

Third-place match

Final

References

External links
Official website
futbol24.com; Schedule, results

2013
2013 in women's association football
2013 in South American football
Lib
International club association football competitions hosted by Brazil
International women's association football competitions hosted by Brazil